Lord Clarendon was the largest wooden ship ever built in Cape Breton Island, Nova Scotia. The ship was named in honour of the British statesman, George Villiers, the 4th Earl of Clarendon. The ship was built at North Sydney by William Nesbitt to order for clients in Great Britain. She was completed in November 1851 and left North Sydney for Liverpool, England with a cargo of timber on November 13 under the command of Samuel Hannan.  Her rudder was damaged by a severe storm hours after leaving port and the ship turned back for North Sydney for repairs. However Lord Clarendon ran aground at Low Point at the entrance to Sydney Harbour. The ship was not badly damaged and plans were made to refloat her as soon as the weather calmed.  However a violent gale on November 26 carried away the foremast and mainmast, damaging the ship beyond repair. The crew were rescued the next day. The ship soon broke apart but some cargo and fittings were salvaged.

References

John Parker, Cape Breton Ships and Men, (London: Hazell Watson & Viney, 1967) p. 48-49, p. 178.

External links
 Parks Canada Ship Information Database Registry Information, ship Lord Clarendon, official no. 9017946

Maritime history of Canada
Tall ships of Canada
Individual sailing vessels
Ships built in Nova Scotia
Victorian-era merchant ships of Canada
Sailing ships of Canada
Shipwrecks of the Nova Scotia coast
History of the Cape Breton Regional Municipality
1851 ships
Maritime incidents in November 1851
Full-rigged ships